Kavir Rural District is a rural district (dehestan) in Kavirat District, Aran va Bidgol County, Isfahan Province, Iran. At the 2006 census, its population was 4,001, in 1,056 families.  The rural district has 6 villages.

References 

Rural Districts of Isfahan Province
Aran va Bidgol County